Isocetane (2,2,4,4,6,8,8-heptamethylnonane) is a highly branched alkane used as a reference in determining the cetane number of diesel. It has a cetane number of 15. Isocetane replaced 1-methylnaphthalene in 1962 as the lower reference for cetane number (1-methylnaphthalene has cetane number zero) owing to the oxidation instability and difficulty of use of 1-methylnaphthalene in the reference engine.

Strictly speaking, if the standard meaning of ‘iso’ is followed, the name isocetane should be reserved for the isomer 2-methylpentadecane.  However, 2,2,4,4,6,8,8-heptamethylnonane is by far the most important isomer of cetane and so, historically, it has ended up with this name.

References

Alkanes